Joseph Eddleston (29 December 1896 – 24 March 1959) was an English professional association footballer who played as an inside forward. He played in The Football League for Blackburn Rovers, Nelson, Swindon Town and Accrington Stanley. Altogether, he made over 400 league appearances, scoring 178 goals.

References

People from Oswaldtwistle
English footballers
Association football forwards
Blackburn Rovers F.C. players
Nelson F.C. players
Swindon Town F.C. players
Accrington Stanley F.C. (1891) players
1896 births
1955 deaths